Ahmad Wahyudi (born 24 August 2001) is an Indonesian professional footballer who plays as a defender for Liga 2 club Persela Lamongan. He is the youngest brother of Indonesian footballer Dimas Drajad.

Club career

Persela Lamongan
He was signed for Persela Lamongan to play in Liga 1 in the 2021 season. Wahyudi made his professional debut on 2 December 2021 in a match against PSM Makassar at the Moch. Soebroto Stadium, Magelang.

Career statistics

Club

Notes

References

External links
 Ahmad Wahyudi at Soccerway
 Ahmad Wahyudi at Liga Indonesia

2001 births
Living people
Indonesian footballers
Persela Lamongan players
Association football defenders
People from Gresik Regency
Sportspeople from East Java